Gungmin(-)dang, Gungminui(-)dang, or Gungmin(-)jeongdang, literally Nationalist Party (or People's Party/People Party) may also refer to:

Korea (until 1948)
Korean Nationalist Party (1928), political party in 1928.
Nationalist Party, also known as Korean Nationalist Party, political party from 1945 to 1947.
Korean Women's Nationalist Party, political party from 1945 to 1960.

South Korea (1948-)
Korea Nationalist Party, political party from 1949 to 1958.
Democratic Nationalist Party (South Korea), political party from 1949 to 1955.
People's Party (South Korea, 1963), political party from 1963 to 1964.
Nationalist Party (South Korea), political party from 1971 to 1972.
Korean National Party, political party from 1981 to 1987.
Unification People's Party, political party from 1992 to 1994.
People's New Party (South Korea), political party from 1997 to 1998.
Democratic People's Party (South Korea), political party from 2000 to 2004.
People's Party for Reform, political party from 2002 to 2004.
People Party (South Korea, 2016), political party from 2016 to 2018.
People Party (South Korea), political party since 2020.

See also
National Congress for New Politics, political party from 1995 to 2000.
Participation Party (South Korea), political party from 2010 to 2011.
Korea Vision Party, political party 2012.
Gongsandang (disambiguation)
Jinbodang (disambiguation)
Kuomintang
Minjudang (disambiguation)
Nodongdang (disambiguation)
Sinmindang (disambiguation)